Sonic German Beatdown – Live in Germany is the second live album by the American thrash metal band Death Angel, released in 2009. The album was recorded from their performance at Rock Hard Festival in Gelsenkirchen, Germany, on May 26, 2007. A DVD recording of the concert was released simultaneously.

Track listing 
"Intro" – 0:46
"Seemingly Endless Time" – 4:37
"Voracious Souls" – 7:03
"Mistress of Pain" – 4:48
"Ex-Tc" – 3:04
"3rd Floor" – 4:56
"Thrown to the Wolves" – 6:36
"5 Steps of Freedom" – 4:34
"Thicker Than Blood" – 4:12
"The Devil Incarnate" – 8:50
"Disturbing the Peace" – 4:32
"Stagnant" – 6:18
"The Ultra-Violence" – 4:34
"Bored" – 3:50
"Kill as One" – 9:52

Credits 
Mark Osegueda – vocals
Rob Cavestany – guitars
Ted Aguilar – guitars
Dennis Pepa – bass
Andy Galeon – drums

References 

Death Angel albums
2009 live albums
Nuclear Blast live albums
Live thrash metal albums